A list of films produced in Pakistan in 1961 (see 1961 in film) and in the Urdu language:

1961

See also
 1961 in Pakistan

References

External links
 Search Pakistani film - IMDB.com

1961
Lists of 1961 films by country or language
Films